The 2014–2015 Israel Football League season was the eighth season of the Israel Football League (IFL) and concluded with the Judean Rebels defeating the Tel Aviv Pioneers, 20-10, in Israel Bowl VIII.

Regular season 
The regular season saw the Judean Rebels earn the top seed in the postseason with an undefeated record.

Playoffs 

In the Quarterfinals, the Hammers defeated the Lions and the Underdogs defeated the Troopers. In the Semifinals, the Rebels defeated the Hammers and the Pioneers defeated the Underdogs. In Israel Bowl VIII, the Rebels completed a perfect season by defeating the Pioneers 20-10. Dani Eastman was named Israel Bowl MVP. 

  * Indicates overtime victory

Awards 

 Most Valuable Player: Dani Eastman, RB/DB/RS, Judean Rebels
 Offensive Player of the Year: Avrami Farkas, QB, Judean Rebels
 Defensive Player of the Year: Sandro Kalandadze, DE/LB, Beersheva Black Swarm
 Special Team Player of the Year: Elan Neiger, RS/P, Tel Aviv Pioneers
 Coaching Staff of the Year: Haifa Underdogs
 Offensive Rookie of the Year: Jason Armstead, RB, Haifa Underdogs
 Defensive Rookie of the Year: Rudy Rattner, DE, Haifa Underdogs
 Howie Osterer Sportsmanship Award: Dani Eastman, Judean Rebels

References 

Israel Football League Seasons